The  is one of the  of the Ministry of the Interior during the pre-World War I period and later the Ministry of Education, Science, Sports and Culture.

It was split off from the Bureau of Shrines and Temples in 1900

Outline 
Initially, religious administration was under the jurisdiction of the Bureau of Shrines and Temples of the Ministry of the Interior, but in April 1900, it was separated into the Bureau of Shrines and the Bureau of Religion. The first and second divisions were set up with jurisdictions over Shinto, Buddhist, and other religious affairs, as well as monks' and teachers' affairs.

On June 13, 1913, the Bureau of Religion was transferred from the jurisdiction of the Home Ministry to the Ministry of Education, Science, Sports and Culture. It was in charge of denominations, sects, associations, priests, teachers, and other matters related to religion, such as Buddhist temples and the preservation of old shrines and temples.

On December 22, 1924, the First Section was renamed the Religious Affairs Section and the Second Section was renamed the Ancient Shrine and Temple Preservation Section. On December 1, 1928, the Division for the Preservation of Ancient Temples and Shrines was renamed the Preservation Division In 1942 it was abolished and went through a few successor institutions until complete abolition after the end of World War II.

References

Bibliography 
 
 

Government agencies disestablished in 1942
Government agencies established in 1900
Home Ministry (Japan)
Pages with unreviewed translations